Herman Adam Negrete is a Mexican athlete (born Poza Rica, 2 August 1965). He has participated in the Olympic Games, World Athletics Championships, and other international competitions. His athletic disciplines include the 100m, 200m, 400m, long jump, and the 4 × 100 m and 4 × 400 m relays, his best record 10.39sec in 100m at CONADEIP is still unbeaten.

Biography
His parents were Jorge Adam Hernández and Carmen Negrete Pulido. At an early age he took part in baseball and American football, but achieved his main successes in athletics, competing at international level. He graduated from the Universidad de las Américas Puebla.

International events
Herman competed in the following:
 Seoul Olympics, South Korea 1988.
 Barcelona Olympics, Spain 1992.
 1991 World Championships in Athletics, Tokyo, Japan 1991.
 1993 World Championships in Athletics, Stuttgart, Germany 1993.
 1991 Central American and Caribbean Championships in Athletics, Jalapa, 1991.
 1993 Central American and Caribbean Championships in Athletics, Cali, 1993.
 1988 Ibero-American Championships in Athletics, Mexico City, 1988.
 1992 Ibero-American Championships in Athletics, Seville, Spain, 1992.
 1990 Central American and Caribbean Games, Mexico City, 1990.
 1987 Summer Universiade, Zagreb, Yugoslavia 1987.

Best results
 Record National Championship de Invitación Jorge Molina Celis 100m 10.2 sec
 Record National Championship CONADEIP 1989 100m 10.39 sec
 Record National 4 × 100 m Relay (Selección México) 39.32 sec

Projects
The "Herman Adam" Athletics Club has been a leading athletics team for children and young people at the Veracruz stadium, and its members have included medal-winners at the national level.

References

External links

1965 births
People from Poza Rica
Sportspeople from Veracruz
Mexican male sprinters
Olympic athletes of Mexico
Athletes (track and field) at the 1988 Summer Olympics
World Athletics Championships athletes for Mexico
Living people
20th-century Mexican people